Anaphyllum is a genus of flowering plants in the family Araceae. It consists of two species. They are found in marshes, have leaves with some pinnation, and have a twisted spathe. The two species in this genus are similar in appearance to those in the genus Anaphyllopsis.

Anaphyllum beddomei Engl. - Tamil Nadu, Lakshadweep (Laccadive Islands)
Anaphyllum wightii Schott. - Kerala, Lakshadweep (Laccadive Islands)

References

Lasioideae
Araceae genera